Amarun is a village in Bhatar CD block in Bardhaman Sadar North subdivision of Purba Bardhaman district in the state of West Bengal, India.

History
Census 2011 Amarun Village Location Code or Village Code 319855. The village of Amarun is located in the Bhatar tehsil of Burdwan district in West Bengal, India.

Demographics
The total geographic area of village is  653.97 hectares. Amarun features a total population of 2639 peoples. There are about 217 houses in Amarun village.

Population and house data

Transport 

Healthcare
Nearest Rural Hospital at Bhatar (with 60 beds) is the main medical facility in Bhatar CD block. There are primary health centres

External links
 Map
 Ratanpur

References 

Villages in Purba Bardhaman district